The PEN/Faulkner Award for Fiction is awarded annually by the PEN/Faulkner Foundation to the authors of the year's best works of fiction by living American citizens.  The winner receives US$15,000 and each of four runners-up receives US$5000. Finalists read from their works at the presentation ceremony in the Great Hall of the Folger Shakespeare Library in Washington, D.C. The organization claims it to be "the largest peer-juried award in the country." The award was first given in 1981.

The PEN/Faulkner Foundation is an outgrowth of William Faulkner's use of his 1949 Nobel Prize winnings to create the William Faulkner Foundation; among the charitable goals of the foundation was "to establish a fund to support and encourage new fiction writers." The foundation's first award for a "notable first novel," called the William Faulkner Foundation Award, was granted to John Knowles's A Separate Peace in 1961. The foundation was dissolved after 1970. 
 
Mary Lee Settle was one of the founders of the PEN/Faulkner award following the controversy at the 1979 National Book Award, when PEN voted for a boycott on the grounds that the award had become too commercial. The award is affiliated with the writers' organization International PEN.

The award is one of many PEN awards sponsored by PEN International affiliates in over 145 PEN centres around the world.

PEN/Faulkner Award for Fiction

1980s

1990s

2000s

2010s

2020s

References

External links
PEN/Faulkner Foundation

William Faulkner
PEN/Faulkner Foundation awards
American fiction awards
Awards established in 1981
1981 establishments in the United States
Folger Shakespeare Library